Michael Freilich may refer to:

 Michael Freilich (politician) (born 1980), Belgian journalist and politician
 Michael Freilich (oceanographer) (1954–2020), director of NASA's Earth science program
 Sentinel-6 Michael Freilich (launched 2020), an oceanographic satellite